Mirza Hoseynabad (also Romanized as Mīrzā Ḩoseynābād; also known as Magin, Māzhīn, Mazhīr, and Mīrzā Ḩoseynābād-e Māzhīn) is a city in Majin Rural District, Majin District, Darreh Shahr County, Ilam Province, Iran. At the 2006 census, its population was 973, in 200 families. The city is populated by Lurs.

References 

Populated places in Darreh Shahr County
Cities in Ilam Province
Luri settlements in Ilam Province